Joseph Harry René Tremblay (September 21, 1899 – November 26, 1990) was a provincial politician from Alberta, Canada. He served as a member of the Legislative Assembly of Alberta from 1940 to 1944, sitting as a Liberal member from the constituency of Grouard.

During the Second World War, he served as an officer in the Loyal Edmonton Regiment, rising to the rank of lieutenant-colonel. J.H Tremblay left the Canadian Army in October 1945 to work for the Commercial Intelligence Service, with the Canadian Department of Trade and Commerce in Ottawa.

References

1990 deaths
1899 births
Alberta Liberal Party MLAs
People from Saguenay, Quebec